Lasianthaea is a genus of flowering plants in the family Asteraceae. The species are native primarily to Mexico, with one species extending just over the border into the United States and another south to northwestern South America.

 Species
 Lasianthaea aurea (D.Don) K.M.Becker - México State
 Lasianthaea beckeri B.L.Turner - Jalisco
 Lasianthaea ceanothifolia (Willd.) K.M.Becker - central Mexico
 Lasianthaea crocea (A.Gray) K.M.Becker - Oaxaca, Jalisco, Morelos, Nayarit, Michoacán, México State
 Lasianthaea fruticosa (L.) K.M.Becker - Mexico, Central America, Colombia, Venezuela
 Lasianthaea gentryi B.L.Turner - Sinaloa
 Lasianthaea helianthoides Zucc. ex DC. - Oaxaca, Jalisco, Morelos, Nayarit, Michoacán, México State
 Lasianthaea machucana B.L.Turner - Jalisco
 Lasianthaea macrocephala (Hook. & Arn.) K.M.Becker - Oaxaca, Jalisco, Morelos, Nayarit, Michoacán, México State, Colima, Sinaloa
 Lasianthaea palmeri (Greenm.) K.M.Becker - Jalisco, Chihuahua, Nayarit, Zacatecas
 Lasianthaea podocephala (A.Gray) K.M.Becker - 	Chihuahua, Sonora, Sinaloa, Arizona (Pima, Santa Cruz, Cochise Cos), New Mexico (Hidalgo Co)
 Lasianthaea ritovegana B.L.Turner - Sinaloa
 Lasianthaea rosei (Greenm.) McVaugh - Nayarit
 Lasianthaea seemannii (A.Gray) K.M.Becker - Nayarit, Sonora
 Lasianthaea squarrosa (Greenm. ex Greenm.) K.M.Becker - Guerrero
 Lasianthaea zinnioides (Hemsl.) K.M.Becker - Nayarit

References

Heliantheae
Asteraceae genera
Flora of North America